Jack Holt may refer to:

Jack Holt (actor) (1888–1951)
Jack Holt (dinghy designer) (1912–1995)
Jack Holt (trainer) (c. 1880–1951), Australian racehorse trainer and philanthropist
Jack Holt, character in Outcasts (TV series)
Johnny Holt, also known as Jack Holt (born 1865), Everton, Reading and England footballer
Jack Holt (footballer) (1883–1921), Australian rules footballer

See also
John Holt (disambiguation)